The 1931 Marquette Golden Avalanche football team represented Marquette University as an independent during the 1931 college football season. In its 10th season under head coach Frank Murray, the team compiled an 8–1 record, shut out five of nine opponents, and outscored all opponents by a total of 172 to 25. The sole setback was a loss to Gus Dorais' Detroit Titans on October 16. Marquette played its home games at Marquette Stadium in Milwaukee.

Frank Murray was Marquette's head football coach for 19 years and was posthumously inducted into the College Football Hall of Fame in 1983.

Schedule

References

Marquette
Marquette Golden Avalanche football seasons
Marquette Golden Avalanche football